NASL or Nasl may refer to:

 Nasl, Iran (disambiguation)
 NASL Soccer, a 1980 early sports videogame
 National Association for the Support of Long Term Care, a US national trade association
 Nessus Attack Scripting Language
 North American Soccer League (1968–1984)
 North American Soccer League (2011–2017)
 North American Star League, a professional esports league for the real-time strategy game StarCraft II
 Nasl, a name for the star Gamma2 Sagittarii